Proserpine State High School (established in 1963) is a public high school in the town of Proserpine in Queensland, Australia.

History

Campus 
The school was established in 1963. Since then, several buildings have been refurbished and a number of new structures have been erected but the school still retains a lot of its original façades and layout. The school contains many lettered blocks, starting from A block right up to O block. N block is the area of the school where the grade 7s are, O block grade 8s, D block grade 9s and A block grades 10–12.

Over the last two decades, significant investment has occurred at the school, on 13 March 2019 a new $20 million upgrade and expansion was launched by Education Minister Grace Grace. Stage 1 of this project will include the construction of a new two-level learning centre comprising five classrooms, one flexible learning area, a design studio and covered under-croft area, with the potential to add an extra four classrooms later, this is expected to be completed by December 2019. Stage 2 of the project expected to start in July 2019 is the construction of a new performing arts centre, this is due for completion in late 2020.

Curriculum 
The school teaches subjects required by the Queensland Studies Authority. The school has a well-funded LOTE and science curriculum but is not particularly underfunded in any other area.

The school uses roll-marking groups called "care groups" to facilitate a class that the students remain in for their entire schooling and for intra-school competitions. These are labeled by the 1st letter of their school house. These go right up from 1 to 9, e.g. F5 for flinders five. C2 for cook 2, etc.

References

External links 
Proserpine State High School

Educational institutions established in 1963
Public high schools in Queensland
Schools in North Queensland
1963 establishments in Australia